Archduchess Maria of Austria (15 May 1531 – 11 December 1581) was the daughter of Emperor Ferdinand I from the House of Habsburg and Anna of Bohemia and Hungary.

She married William, Duke of Jülich-Cleves-Berg on 18 July 1546 as his second wife. Their children were:
 Marie Eleonore (1550–1608); married Albert Frederick, Duke of Prussia
 Anna (1552–1632); married Philip Louis, Count Palatine of Neuburg
 Magdalene (1553–1633); married John I, Count Palatine of Zweibrücken, brother of Philip Louis, Count Palatine of Neuburg
 Charles Frederick (1555–1575)
 Elizabeth (1556–1561)
 Sibylle (1557–1627); married Karl II Habsburg (1560–1618) of Austria, Margrave of Burgau, a morganatic son of Ferdinand II, Archduke of Austria
 John William (1562–1609), Bishop of Münster, Count of Altena, Duke of Jülich-Cleves-Berg; married firstly, in 1585, to Jakobea of Baden (1558–1597), daughter of Philibert, Margrave of Baden-Baden; married secondly, in 1599, to Antonia of Lorraine (1568–1610), daughter of Charles III, Duke of Lorraine)

Ancestors

References

1531 births
1581 deaths
16th-century Austrian women
16th-century German people
16th-century House of Habsburg
16th-century German women
Austrian princesses
Countesses of Mark
Countesses of Ravensberg
Duchesses of Berg
Duchesses of Cleves
Duchesses of Jülich
Daughters of emperors
Children of Ferdinand I, Holy Roman Emperor
Daughters of kings
Nobility from Prague